Ríkisútvarpið (RÚV) (pronounced  or ) is Iceland's national public-service broadcasting organization.

Operating from studios in the country's capital, Reykjavík, as well as regional centres around the country, the service broadcasts an assortment of general programming to a wide national audience via three radio stations: Rás 1 and Rás 2, also available internationally; Rondó (only available via the Internet and digital radio); and one full-time television channel of the same name. There is also a supplementary, part-time TV channel, RÚV 2, which transmits live coverage of major cultural and sporting events, both domestic and foreign, as required.

History

RÚV began radio broadcasting in 1930 and its first television transmissions were made in 1966. In both cases coverage quickly reached nearly every household in Iceland. RÚV is funded by a broadcast receiving licence fee collected from every income tax payer, as well as from a limited amount of on-air advertising. RÚV has been a full active member of the European Broadcasting Union since 1956.

Since 1986, the year in which its monopoly as the only permitted domestic broadcaster ended, RÚV has faced competition from a number of private broadcasting companies, most notably the 365 corporation.

Programming 
RÚV is obliged by the terms of its charter to "promote the Icelandic language, Icelandic history, and Iceland's cultural heritage" and "honour basic democratic rules, human rights, and the freedom of speech and opinion". It carries a substantial amount of arts, media, and current affairs programming, in addition to which it also supplies general entertainment in the form of feature films and such internationally popular television drama series as Lost and Desperate Housewives. RÚV's lineup also includes sports coverage, documentaries, domestically produced entertainment shows, and children's programming.

The RÚV newsroom, providing news for both television and radio, is amongst the most time-honoured and respected in Iceland. On weekdays, the Rás 2 radio network includes 35 minutes of regional opt-outs for local news coverage.

Gettu betur is a popular annual quiz tournament pitting teams from senior secondary schools around Iceland against each other in five rounds which are broadcast on radio and TV. Popular viewing also includes the Eurovision Song Contest, to which RÚV has sent participants on Iceland's behalf since 1986. In sports, RÚV traditionally carries live coverage of such major events as the Olympic Games and the FIFA World Cup, although it lost the right to broadcast the 2006 World Cup, having been outbid by commercial broadcaster 365 in 2002. It did, however, show the 2010 World Cup tournament.

Services 
In accordance with its duty as a public broadcasting service, Sjónvarpið, the television network, broadcasts a news bulletin in Icelandic Sign Language for the deaf and hard of hearing. In addition, the Rás 1 radio channel broadcasts detailed weather reports for Icelandic seafarers and others dependent upon weather conditions.

Television channels 

 RÚV Television (also known as Sjónvarpið) – main channel with generalist programming
 RÚV 2 – part-time "special events" channel

Those who watch television on the internet outside Iceland can only watch selected programs on RÚV and RÚV 2 channels. Except for some television programs, it cannot be watched on internet outside Iceland due to broadcasting rights.

Radio stations 

 Rás 1 (Channel 1) – News, weather, current affairs, culture
 Rás 2 (Channel 2) – Pop and rock music
 Rondó – Non-stop classical music and jazz (digital and web only)

Transmitters
For its longwave transmissions on 189 kHz, RÚV uses Western Europe's tallest radio mast, the Hellissandur longwave radio transmitter. There was a second longwave transmitter on 207 kHz at Eiðar in the east of Iceland. The longwave transmitters are intended to fill gaps in the FM coverage and serve the Icelandic fishing fleet.

The television network previously used 180 analogue transmitters, until the digital switchover in 2015, and is now broadcast over DVB-T2.

Rás 1 and 2 have networks of 90 FM transmitters each.

Satellite broadcasting started in May 2007 by RÚV from Intelsat 10-02 satellite with a frequency of 11182 V 3100 7/8. Television broadcasts are encrypted (due to rights issues) and Rás 1 and Rás 2 radio broadcasts are unencrypted. Satellite broadcasts were later moved to the Thor 5 satellite and are contracted to run until 2028.

See also 
 List of Icelandic television channels

References

External links 

  
 About RÚV: official webpage in English
 Live Radio

1930 establishments in Iceland
Companies based in Reykjavík
European Broadcasting Union members
Mass media companies established in 1930
Mass media companies of Iceland
Publicly funded broadcasters
Radio stations established in 1930
Radio stations in Iceland
State media
Television channels and stations established in 1966